HMS Endurance was a Royal Navy ice patrol vessel that served from 1967 to 1991.
She came to public notice when she was involved in the Falklands War of 1982. The final surrender of the war, in the South Sandwich Islands, took place aboard Endurance.

Background
Kröger-Werft of Germany built her in 1956 as Anita Dan for Lauritzen Lines. The UK government bought her in 1967 and had Harland & Wolff convert her. She was commissioned into the Royal Navy as HMS Endurance, named after the sailing ship Endurance that took the explorer Ernest Shackleton's expedition to the Antarctic in 1914.

Operational history

1967–1982
The new Endurance maintained a UK presence in Antarctica and the Falkland Islands during the southern summer. She also supported the British Antarctic Survey. She had a bright red hull, as is common for polar vessels to aid visibility but otherwise uncommon for the Royal Navy, so her crew nicknamed her The Red Plum. In February 1972 when the cruise ship Lindblad Explorer ran aground, Endurance was in the vicinity under Captain Rodney Bowden and took part in the rescue.

Endurance was equipped with a signals listening suite on top of the hangar, and was staffed with Spanish linguists to monitor radio communications and collect signals intelligence off South America. The data was processed by GCHQ, and in the 1970s underlay much of GCHQ's South America analysis. Endurance'''s captain later stated "It could be argued that the main armament of the ship was the listening suite."

The Ministry of Defence's 1981 Defence White Paper proposed naval cuts including decommissioning Endurance, which was scheduled for 15 April 1982.

Falklands WarEndurances withdrawal from Antarctic patrol without replacement was perceived in Britain The Times 25 March 1982, p 13: letter from BG Frew, Hon Sec UK Falkland Islands Committee as having encouraged the Argentine invasion. The subsequent Franks Report acknowledged that it "may have served to cast doubt on British commitment to the Islands and their defence".

On 19 March 1982, while Endurance was at Stanley, British authorities there received news that an Argentine navy ship had landed Argentine civilians on South Georgia who had raised the Argentine flag.  The Argentine group (containing Argentine Marines in mufti) posing as scrap-metal merchants, occupied the abandoned whaling station at Leith Harbour on South Georgia. Endurance, commanded by Captain Nick Barker, was sent to order the Argentines off the island.Freedman, Lawrence and Gamba, Virginia, Señales de Guerra. Javier Vergara Editor, 1992.  (in Spanish), page 81ss. Endurance had a small Royal Marines detachment and took further Marines from Naval Party 8901 (NP 8901), and sailed on 21 March for South Georgia.

Arriving on 25 March 1982 Endurance encountered the Argentine transport , whose forty Argentine troops had come ashore while the scrapping operation took place. Endurance landed her marines, then returned to the Falklands on 30 March. In April the UK command ordered Endurance to join the UK Task Force, which in April landed SBS soldiers at Hound Bay on South Georgia on 22 April.

Task Force vessels moved into deeper waters as a precaution against Argentine submarines, but Endurance moved into sea ice near the shore.Endurance was involved in combat action on 25 April 1982 when her two Wasp ASW helicopters took part in attacks on the submarine , which was later abandoned by her crew. When Argentine forces surrendered the next day, Endurance remained near the island to show the UK flag, maintain a naval presence, and guard the waters.Endurance also took part in the rescue of wildlife film-makers Cindy Buxton and Annie Price, who were caught up in the war while working on South Georgia.

After the Argentine surrender of the Falkland Islands, Endurance,  and the tug Salvageman sailed to the South Sandwich Islands, where Argentina had established a base in South Thule since 1976. Endurance was carrying a Wessex helicopter for the first time, in addition to her two Wasps. The ten Argentine military personnel surrendered after they saw HMS Yarmouth's firing display and when they realised recce marines from Endurance and 42 Commando Royal Marines had landed. The surrender was signed in the wardroom of Endurance.

1983–1991
Toward the end of her life the ship was nicknamed HMS Encumbrance'' due to reliability problems.

In 1989 she struck an iceberg, and, although she was repaired, a survey in 1991 found that her hull was not sound enough for a return to Antarctica, so she was finally decommissioned.

See also
Endurance Reef

References

External links
 MaritimeQuest photo gallery: HMS Endurance

 

1956 ships
Falklands War in South Georgia
Falklands War naval ships of the United Kingdom
Icebreakers of the United Kingdom
Patrol vessels of the United Kingdom
Ships built in Germany
Survey vessels of the Royal Navy